Arthur B. Ingram, Inghram or Ingraham was a farmer, originally from Tyler County in what was then Virginia.

Legislative service 
Ingram (as he was then known) served five one-year terms in the Virginia House of Delegates representing Tyler County: 1815–1816, 1816–1817, 1826–1827, 1827-1828 and 1828–1829. His sister Sarah was the mother of Arthur Ingram Boreman, later first Governor of West Virginia.

Moving on 
He moved to Illinois, and then to the Wisconsin Territory and served in the 1st Wisconsin Territorial Assembly from 1836 to 1838 representing the southern part of what would soon become the Iowa Territory in the Territorial Council (equivalent of a state senate). He was elected President of the council for the 2nd (1837) session of the legislature, and for a subsequent special session in 1838. Iowa Territory was created July 4, 1838.

His fourth daughter and eighth child, Margaret Fee Ingraham, married W. W. Chapman.

References 

19th-century American politicians
Farmers from Virginia
Farmers from Iowa
Members of the Virginia House of Delegates
Members of the Wisconsin Territorial Legislature
People from Des Moines County, Iowa
People from Tyler County, West Virginia
Boreman family